Chinese apple is a name used for several fruits :

 Citrus × sinensis (orange) is referred to as Chinese apple in Dutch, sinaasappel or appelsien, and sometimes German, Apfelsine, Swedish apelsin, Finnish appelsiini and Danish and Norwegian appelsin, and Icelandic appelsína', and Lithuanian apelsinas.
 Malus prunifolia, a species in the apple genus (Malus) native to China, used as in breeding and sometimes cultivated for its fruit
 Punica granatum (pomegranate) sometimes called Chinese apple in British English
 Syzygium luehmannii (riberry) sometimes called Chinese apple in Australian English
 Ziziphus jujuba is referred to as Chinese apple in Vietnamese, táo tàu, or simply táo.